Portuguese Africa may refer to:
African territories of the Portuguese Empire:
Portuguese Cape Verde
Portuguese Congo
Portuguese East Africa
Portuguese Guinea
Portuguese São Tomé and Príncipe
Portuguese West Africa
Fort of São João Baptista de Ajudá
Portuguese in Africa
Portuguese-speaking African countries (Lusophone Africa)

See also
Portuguese exploration of Africa
Scramble for Africa
Pink Map
Portuguese Colonial War

Portuguese Empire